Pevnost  (The Fortress) is a 1994 Czech film directed by Drahomíra Vihanová. It was the director's second film 20 years after her first was banned just before release, and she was relegated to documentaries. The film starred Josef Kemr.

Cast
 Antonín Brtoun
 György Cserhalmi as Ewald 
 Miroslav Donutil as Dustojník 
 Ivana Hloužková
 Karel Hofman as Fízl 
 Irena Hrubá as Alena 
 Vítězslav Jirsák as Vysetrovátel 
 Josef Kemr as Petrasek 
 Jiří Klepl
 Zuzana Kocúriková as Lydie 
 Vladimír Marek as Hostinský 
 Ilja Prachař as Funktionár 
 Milan Rybák
 Jan Schmid as úredník 
 Pavel Soukup

References

External links
 

1994 films
Czech drama films
1990s Czech-language films
1994 drama films